Nilus  or Neilos (Ancient Greek: Νειλος or Νεῖλόν), in Greek mythology, was one of the Potamoi who represent the god of the Nile river itself.

Family 
Nilus was one of 3,000 river gods children of the Titans Oceanus and his sister-wife Tethys. He was father to several children, of these included Memphis (mother of Libya by Epaphus a king of Egypt), as well as a son named Nilus Ankhmemiphis (the father of Anchinoe and Telephassa).

His granddaughter Libya in turn became mother to Belus and Agenor. These sons then married (presumably) younger daughters of his son Nilus named Anchiroe and Telephassa, respectively. A daughter Chione was said to be borne to Nilus and Callirhoe, an Oceanid. His other children include: Argiope, Anippe, Eurryroe, Europa and possibly Caliadne, Polyxo and Thebe.

Mythology

Parentage 
 Hesiod, Theogony:

 Hyginus, Fabulae:

Offspring 
 Apollodorus, Bibliotheca:

 Apollodorus, Bibliotheca:

 Pseudo-Plutarch, Greek and Roman Parallel Stories:

 Tzetzes, Chiliades:

See also 
 Hapi (Nile god)
 Nile God Statue, Naples

Notes

References 
 Apollodorus, The Library with an English Translation by Sir James George Frazer, F.B.A., F.R.S. in 2 Volumes, Cambridge, MA, Harvard University Press; London, William Heinemann Ltd. 1921. ISBN 0-674-99135-4. Online version at the Perseus Digital Library. Greek text available from the same website.
Fowler, Robert. L. (2000), Early Greek Mythography: Volume 1: Text and Introduction, Oxford University Press, 2000. .
 Gantz, Timothy, Early Greek Myth: A Guide to Literary and Artistic Sources, Johns Hopkins University Press, 1996, Two volumes:  (Vol. 1),  (Vol. 2).
Gaius Julius Hyginus, Fabulae from The Myths of Hyginus translated and edited by Mary Grant. University of Kansas Publications in Humanistic Studies. Online version at the Topos Text Project.
 Hesiod, Theogony from The Homeric Hymns and Homerica with an English Translation by Hugh G. Evelyn-White, Cambridge, MA.,Harvard University Press; London, William Heinemann Ltd. 1914. Online version at the Perseus Digital Library. Greek text available from the same website.
 Tzetzes, John, Book of Histories, Book VII-VIII translated by Vasiliki Dogani from the original Greek of T. Kiessling's edition of 1826.  Online version at theio.com
 Lucius Mestrius Plutarchus, Moralia with an English Translation by Frank Cole Babbitt. Cambridge, MA. Harvard University Press. London. William Heinemann Ltd. 1936. Online version at the Perseus Digital Library. Greek text available from the same website.
 Maurus Servius Honoratus, In Vergilii carmina comentarii. Servii Grammatici qui feruntur in Vergilii carmina commentarii; recensuerunt Georgius Thilo et Hermannus Hagen. Georgius Thilo. Leipzig. B. G. Teubner. 1881. Online version at the Perseus Digital Library.

Potamoi
Egyptian characters in Greek mythology
Nile
Hellenistic Egyptian deities
Personifications of rivers